Different Stars is the second album by the American rock band Trespassers William. It was originally self-released in the United States on September 28, 2002 on the band's Sonik Wire label, released in the UK on Bella Union in 2003, and finally re-released in the United States with minor track changes on Nettwerk Records on October 19, 2004.

The album's second single, "Lie in the Sound", was used in three episodes of the television series One Tree Hill. It was featured on the One Tree Hill – Music from the WB Television Series, Vol. 1 soundtrack. The title track was used in the first season of The O.C. and "Fragment" was in the show Brothers & Sisters.

Track listing

Self-released (2002) 
All songs written by Anna-Lynne Williams, except as noted.

Bella Union version (2003)

Nettwerk version (2004)

Reception 

Allmusic's MacKenzie Wilson gave Different Stars a three-and-a-half star review, praising the band's "hypnotic and lush soundscape" and drawing comparisons to The Sundays and Mazzy Star. Drowned in Sound listed the album on "The Beginner's Guide to Slowcore" and called it "a solitary trip through the fog, Anna-Lynne Williams sailing voice pushing over dark dream-pop waters, played only at fragile volumes and careful times." Adam Knott of Sputnikmusic significantly praised the album for the "quality of the songwriting and the allure of Williams' voice", noting how "2004 passed by without the mainstream or many at all knowing that Different Stars existed, and it's not wholly surprising; it's an album far too heavy and deliberate to listen to on a whim."

Scottish footballer Pat Nevin listed the album as one of his 13 favorite records.

Personnel

Trespassers William 

 Matt Brown – acoustic and electric guitar, artwork, engineer, keyboards
 Trinidad Sanchez III – bass guitar
 Justin Schier – keyboards
 Anna-Lynne Williams – vocals, acoustic guitar

Additional producers 
Kevin Bartley – mastering
 Elijah Thomson – mixing

References 

Trespassers William albums
2002 albums
2004 albums
Self-released albums